Chrysorabdia is a genus of moths in the subfamily Arctiinae. The genus was erected by Arthur Gardiner Butler in 1877.

Species
 Chrysorabdia alpina
 Chrysorabdia aurantiaca
 Chrysorabdia bivitta
 Chrysorabdia vilemani
 Chrysorabdia viridata

References

External links

Lithosiini
Moth genera